Adham Al-Sqour (born ) is a Jordanian male artistic gymnast, representing his nation at international competitions. He competed at world championships, including the 2014 World Artistic Gymnastics Championships in  Nanning, China.

References

1994 births
Living people
Jordanian male artistic gymnasts
Place of birth missing (living people)